Carl Rice (born 1980) is a British actor from Liverpool. He has appeared in Brookside, Brassic, Jimmy McGovern’s Hearts and Minds and more. He also founded Milk Pictures in 2021.

Early life 
In 1980, Rice was born in Liverpool, England. Rice attended St Joseph's R.C High School in Widnes, Cheshire.

Career 
Rice first appeared on screen at the age of eight in a late 1980s advert for milk. The advert famously proclaimed "Accrington Stanley, Who Are They?"

Following this, he appeared in 15 other advertisements. He also starred alongside Tony Robinson for three years on Channel 4's Storyworld, Children's Ward for 2 series, Brookside for one year playing Gavin Matthews and numerous TV shows including Jimmy McGovern's Hearts and Minds alongside Christopher Eccleston and Willy Russell's Terraces alongside Mark Womack.

In 1999, Rice made his stage debut in Guiding Star, a play by Jonathan Harvey that was premiered at the Everyman Theatre, Liverpool before transferring to the Royal National Theatre for a 10-month run. Rice was shortlisted for a Laurence Olivier Award for his performance as Liam Fitzgibbon.

In 2000, he played Rene Montandon in Monsignor Renard, an ITV drama set in Nazi-occupied France, starring John Thaw, Dominic Monaghan and Juliette Caton.

Carl has been in every series of Brassic since 2019, playing Ronnie Croft.

In late 2021 Carl set up Milk Pictures, an independent production company.

21st century

2000s
He starred in two series of the comedy sketch show Scallywagga on BBC Three playing over fifty characters. He starred in comedy series Massive on BBC Three playing Shay Finnegan alongside Johnny Vegas, Ralf Little, Joel Fry, Christine Bottomley and Craig Parkinson.

2010s
In February 2011, he guest starred on Shameless, playing Mimi Maguire's long-lost transgender sister, Bobbi Hepburn. In August 2011, Rice started filming on the Sky comedy Trollied. Rice played Colin, a lazy supermarket worker who has appeared in every episode. In 2012, he also appeared in the feature film Papadopoulos & Sons, in which he played Dave, a gardener to a wealthy Greek family. Rice also filmed a guest lead in Holby City in December 2011. Rice shot a Guest Lead on Benidorm in late 2011, playing Danny, a lothario who runs the booze cruise on the island.

Rice starred in Good Cop in 2012. Good Cop was a dark, RTS Award-winning drama for BBC1 written by Stephen Butchard and directed by Sam Miller (Luther). Rice played Philip Davenport, one of the regular police in the series and worked alongside Warren Brown, Mark Womack, Stephen Graham, Stephen Walters and Kerrie Hayes.

Rice has shot a series each year of Trollied and completed filming on series 6 in July 2016. He appeared in 8 episodes of Coronation Street from late 2015 to early 2016. Rice appeared in two episodes of Stan Lee's Lucky Man alongside James Nesbitt. Rice guest starred in Jimmy McGovern's Moving On in 2016 (Series 8).

Rice recently starred in the ITV drama Deep Water alongside Anna Friel and Sinead Keenan. Carl has been in every series of Brassic, playing Ronnie Croft and returns for his final farewell in series 5 this summer.

2020s
Rice very recently finished filming on the Disney blockbuster Cruella starring Emma Stone and Emma Thompson. 

Rice has a number of writing projects commissioned and in development including rewriting a feature film for Calamity Films (Judy, Last Christmas) and a project with LIME productions co-written with Joel Fry.

Carl performed his one man show 'Superstar' for the Liverpool Theatre Festival, receiving 5 star reviews and offers from other theatres. 
Another play 'Curtains Down' is currently being rewritten and Carl is in talks with a number of theatres with dates to be confirmed.

In late 2021 Carl set up Milk Pictures, an independent production company. Their developing projects include noir drama series 'Something in the Water', starring Michelle Keegan and factual docuseries 'Step Out', featuring Molly Mcann and Paddy Pimblett. 2022 sees a number of projects & scripts in development through Milk Pictures, including 'KID GLOVES' a faux documentary set in and around a boxing gym in Liverpool with names such as Dominic West, Adeel Akhtar, Adam Gillen and Isy Suttieattached, along with voice over narration from Mark Addy and original music written for the show by Miles Kane.

Filmography

References

External links
 

1980 births
Living people
English male television actors
English male stage actors
Male actors from Liverpool